Six Flags St. Louis, originally known as Six Flags Over Mid-America, is an amusement park featuring characters and rides from many Warner Bros. films and tv shows such as, Looney Tunes, DC Comics, and formerly Scooby-Doo. It is located in Eureka, Missouri, which is a suburb of St. Louis, Missouri. Owned and operated by Six Flags, the park opened on June 5, 1971 as the third of the company's three original theme parks. It is the only one of the original three Six Flags parks to be both owned and operated by Six Flags. (The other two, Six Flags Over Texas and Six Flags Over Georgia, are owned by limited partnerships and operated by Six Flags.)  The park was conceived by Six Flags founder Angus G. Wynne in the 1960s, although unlike the previous two Six Flags parks, it was designed by the Six Flags company itself rather than architect Randall Duell, who was preoccupied with designing AstroWorld at the time. Its layout consists of eight themed areas, each of which contain numerous attractions, dining locations and live entertainment. The adjacent Hurricane Harbor water park is free with park admission.

Since its original opening in 1971, the park has undergone many changes, most notably of which are the replacement or renaming of all six of the park's original areas in the 1990s, as well as the addition of two new ones.

There are many celebrations and events held year round at the park. Some of the most popular are Fright Fest runs during the Halloween season (usually late September to late October/early November) and features many Halloween decorations and haunted houses. Coca-Cola's  Fest takes place July 3–5 and features firework displays. Formerly Holiday in the Park during the Christmas season that ran from November to early January and featured Christmas decorations, music, New Years fireworks, and more.

History

Opening and operation

Plans for a Six Flags park in the St. Louis area were announced on July 16, 1969, which would be called Six Flags Over Mid-America. The park opened on June 5, 1971, the third and last of the three "true" Six Flags parks as envisioned by Angus G. Wynne. The park was divided into six uniquely themed sections, the namesake "Six Flags" over Mid-America:

 Missouri (now 1904 World's Fair), the main entry of the park, themed after the St. Louis World's Fair of 1904. 
 U.S.A. (replaced by Time Warner Studios in 1995), located in the southeast of the park, with a patriotic theme, after the United States. 
France (now Chouteau's Market), located to the east, adjacent to U.S.A., themed after a colonial French trading post.
Spain (replaced by DC Comics Plaza in 1997), located in the southwest of the park, with Spanish-themed architecture and restaurants. 
England (now Britannia), located in the northwest of the park, themed after a village in Medieval England. 
Old Chicago (currently known as Illinois), located in the northeast section of the park, themed after the city of Chicago in the early 1900s.

On June 5, 1999, the 12-acre Six Flags Hurricane Harbor water park opened, adjacent to the main park. At a cost of $17 million, it was the largest single investment in Six Flags St. Louis' history.

In 2014, Six Flags sold 180 acres of unused land to the east of the park to developer McBride & Sons, effectively reducing the total property area of the park from 503 acres to 323 acres. According to the Six Flags 2015 Annual Report, the park now owns 323 acres of land (with 283 acres of land used for the park, plus an additional 40 acres of undeveloped land).

In January 2020, construction began on a renovated entry plaza, removing the original ticket booths that had been at the park since its opening in 1971. Subsequently, in March of the same year, Six Flags St. Louis announced that the opening of their 2020 season would be delayed, due to the COVID-19 pandemic.

Areas and attractions 
Six Flags St. Louis is divided into eight themed sections, all of which were added after the park's opening or renamed. The park is laid out in a "Duell loop", a design concept that was often used by park designer Randall Duell.

1904 World's Fair 
1904 World's Fair is the main area of the park, named after the Louisiana Purchase Exposition in St. Louis, which ran from April 30 to December 1, 1904. The area features the "Mall of the Mid-Americas", a shopping mall complex that features many foods introduced or present at the fair, as well as buildings themed to the time period of the early 1900s. The area was previously named "Missouri" from the park's opening until 1994 season.

Gateway to the West 
Gateway to the West is themed after the old colonial times of the state of Missouri, and features many references to locales and people that have lived in the state. The area opened in 1993, taking over a part of what was formerly the Missouri section of the park.

Chouteau's Market 
Chouteau's Market is themed after a French market along the Mississippi River. It is named after Auguste Chouteau, the founder of the city of St. Louis. The area opened in 1993, replacing France. In 2014, the area was expanded to take over a piece of what had formerly been the back of Studio Backlot.

Studio Backlot 
Studio Backlot is themed to the backlot of a movie studio in Hollywood. The area originally opened in 1995 as "Time Warner Studios", but was renamed "Warner Bros. Backlot" the following year.

In the first couple years, the area featured five interactive movie set experiences based on various Warner Bros. films, including Bonnie and Clyde, Little Shop of Horrors and Maverick, all of which were retired after the 1997 season. The area's name was changed again to its current name in 2002, though it mostly retains its previous theme.

DC Comics Plaza 
DC Comics Plaza celebrates the worlds of DC Entertainment, with several attractions based on various DC characters and properties. The area opened in 1997, replacing the former Spain section of the park. One of DC Comics Plaza's most iconic features is DC Circle, a section of the ground that is designed after DC's longtime "DC Bullet" logo. The visual centerpiece of the Plaza is the Hall of Justice, which serves as the facade and entrance for Justice League: Battle for Metropolis. Directly to the opposite side is the large, snowman-themed facade of the "Snowy's Ice Cream Factory Tours", which is the entrance to Mr. Freeze: Reverse Blast.

Britannia 
Britannia is based on the country of Great Britain as it was in its medieval period, including elements from Arthurian legend. The area was named "England" from 1971 to 1992, then "Great Britain" in 1993, and it was given its current name in 1994.

Illinois 
Illinois is loosely themed to the city of Chicago. The area was formerly known as "Old Chicago" from 1971 to 1993.

Bugs Bunny National Park 
Bugs Bunny National Park is a kiddie area based on the Looney Tunes franchise. It opened in 2006 as the successor to Looney Tunes Town. It replaced some former land that Britannia used to occupy.

Roller Coasters

Six Flags Hurricane Harbor
Hurricane Harbor is a water park that is connected to the southeast portion of Six Flags St. Louis and is adjacent to Studio Backlot, but is not part of the main park.

Unlike other Six Flags Hurricane Harbors across the United States, entrance to the Six Flags St. Louis version is included with park admission or a Season Pass.

Entertainment Venues 
Six Flags St. Louis has several theaters that host daily shows during its operating season. With the exception of the summer concert series, all shows are free to attend.

Annual events
A number of annual seasonal events are held at the park:

July 4th Fest
 Fest was introduced in the 2000s and features multiple nights of fireworks for the Fourth of July. It is typically sponsored by Coca-Cola.

Fright Fest

Fright Fest was introduced in 1988 as "Fright Nights", which ran until Fright Nights V in 1992. In 1993, the event became Fright Fest under the ownership of Time Warner, who wanted each Six Flags park's Halloween event to use the same name for branding purposes. The event runs from mid to late September through Halloween and typically features several haunted attractions and scare zones, as well as live entertainment. Fright Fest celebrated its 30th anniversary in 2018.

Fright Fest was replaced with HALLOWFEST in 2020 in response to the COVID-19 pandemic. Park capacity was reduced to 25% of its normal capacity and all haunted houses, scare zones, and shows were replaced with outdoor, socially distanced alternatives.

Holiday in the Park

A holiday event was introduced in 2016 which features several themed areas as well as live entertainment. The event extended the park's operating season by two months for the first time in its history. It did not return in 2022.

Holiday Square and Cosmic Sleigh Ride
For the 2022 season, Holiday in the Park was replaced by Cosmic Sleigh Ride & Holiday Square.

Cinco de Mayo Celebration
A new Event, Cinco de Mayo Celebration, began for the 2023 season. According to Six flags, "Tacos, margaritas, music, and coasters all in one place for Cinco de Mayo weekend!"

Kids Weekend
Throughout weekends in June, Kids Weekends, happens. Kids Weekend features decorations, entertainment, and food offerings. According to Six Flags, "This event is all about the kids. Foam cannons, dance parties, and snow cones will be at Six Flags every weekend in June." Kids Weekend inaugural season is 2023.

Summer Vibes
Presented by M&Ms, Summers Vibes features food offerings, entertainment, and decorations. Summer Vibes is throughout July, after July 4th Fest. According to Six Flags, "This spectacular event features mouth-watering treats, beat-the-heat beverages, and photo moments in both the theme park and the water park." Summer Vibes' inaugural season is 2023.

Former attractions

Gallery

Incidents

References

External links 

 Six Flags St. Louis
 

 
1971 establishments in Missouri
Saint Louis
Saint Louis
Amusement parks in Missouri
Amusement parks opened in 1971
Buildings and structures in St. Louis County, Missouri